Niskus is a Romano-British river god, mentioned one time from a lead curse tablet inscription. The theonym is related to a local river deity linked to the River Hamble. It is possible that the origin of the theonym is connected with the ancient Greek word νῆξις - floating. Found on Creek Badnam in Southampton in 1982, this curse tablet from the Greco-Roman world was created in about 350 or 400 AD by Muconius, a man angry at the mystery thief who stole his gold and silver coins.

Latin Text: 

Translation: 
Lord Neptune, I give you the man who has stolen the solidus and six argentioli of Muconius. So I give the names who took them away, whether male or female, whether boy or girl. So I give you, Niskus, and to Neptune the life, health, blood of him who has been privy to that taking-away. The mind which stole this and which has been privy to it, may you take it away. The thief who stole this, may you consume his blood and take it away, Lord Neptune.

T. Mikhailova's "British and Roman Names from the Sulis -Minerva Temple: Two Solutions to an Old Problem" (31–46) represents the name of god Niskus from the lead curse tablet.

Sources
A Corpus of Writing-Tablets from Roman Britain
Curse Tablets from Roman Britain
Lexicon of the Worlds of the Celtic Gods

References

Celtic gods
Sea and river gods
Celtic mythology